Kanly (Qañlı) is a rural locality (a selo) in Akhmetovsky Selsoviet, Kushnarenkovsky District, Bashkortostan, Russia. The population was 208 as of 2010. There are 3 streets.

Geography 
Kanly is located 20 km east of Kushnarenkovo (the district's administrative centre) by road. Akhmetovo is the nearest rural locality.

References 

Rural localities in Kushnarenkovsky District